A husk is the outer shell or coating of a seed.

Husk may also refer to:

 Husk (comics), a Marvel Comics fictional character
 Husk (film), a 2011 horror film
 Husk (animal disease), also known as parasitic bronchitis
 Husk (surname), list of people with the surname
 Husks, a type of Reaper unit in the Mass Effect trilogy
 The Husks, a fictional race of creatures in the video game Fortnite: Save the World
 Husks, a zombie variant in the 2009 video game Minecraft